A loner is a person who does not seek out, or may actively avoid, interaction with other people. There are many potential reasons for their solitude. Intentional reasons include introversion, mysticism, spirituality, religion, or personal considerations. Unintentional reasons involve being highly sensitive or shy. More than one type of loner exists, and those who meet the criteria for being called loners often actually enjoy social interactions with people but display a degree of introversion which leads them to seek out time alone.

Terminology
The modern term loner can be used in the context of the belief that human beings are social creatures and that those who do not participate are deviants. However, being a loner is sometimes depicted culturally as a positive personality trait, as it can be indicative of independence and responsibility. Someone who is a recluse or romantically solitary can be referred to by terms including singleton and nonwedder. Loners are often mistakenly perceived as having a hatred for other people and can face the ramifications of such a perception, such as being viewed as an outcast or misfit.

Overview

There are different types of loners, including individuals who simply prefer solitude and are content to have very limited social interaction. The first type includes individuals that are forced into isolation because they are, or feel as though they are, rejected by society. This individual typically experiences loneliness. A second type of loner includes those who like to be social and have many social interactions, but who can also spend extended periods of time in solitude without experiencing feelings of loneliness. Those who fall into this category are often colloquially referred to as people who "enjoy their own company".

A third type of loner often does not feel lonely when they are alone, at least not in the same way as a social person who found themselves forcibly isolated would. However, these are broad generalizations, and it is not uncommon for loners to experience both of these dimensions at some point.

Someone who is within the autism spectrum may have difficulty with social interactions, prefer limited hobbies and routines, and have a resistance to change, which make it more likely for them to be a loner. Being a loner is also sometimes associated with individuals who have unusual handicaps, such as the inability to identify and describe emotions. The characteristics of loners are also sometimes attributed to non-human animals such as the leopard, an animal whose behaviour is usually defined by being solitary.

Possible characteristics
When expressing a desire to be alone, loners may not reject human contact entirely. A common example is that of the person who shuns any social interaction with colleagues beyond what is necessary for fulfilling their work or school responsibilities, mainly for practical reasons such as avoiding the complication of their non-personal life, but who is also highly charismatic during social gatherings with people outside of work or schoolor vice versa. Somebody who can be a loner would also fit the criteria for introversion, possibly due to both their innate personality traits and life experiences.

See also

 Alexithymia
 Avoidant personality disorder
 Autism
 Autism spectrum disorder
 Asperger syndrome
 Byronic hero
 Dysfunctional family
 Depression
 Hedgehog's dilemma
 Hermit
 Hikikomori
 Major depressive disorder
 Schizoid personality disorder
 Social phobia
 Social rejection
 Wallflower (people)
 Loneliness

References

External links
 Article about loners in Psychology Today

Human behavior
Pejorative terms for people